The O2 Arena, commonly known as the O2, is a multi-purpose indoor arena in the centre of The O2 entertainment complex on the Greenwich Peninsula in southeast London. It opened in its present form in 2007. It has the second-highest seating capacity of any indoor venue in the United Kingdom, behind the Manchester Arena, and in 2008 was the world's busiest music arena. As of 2022, it is the ninth-largest building in the world by volume.

The arena was built under the Millennium Dome (renamed The O2), a large dome-shaped building built to house an exhibition celebrating the turn of the third millennium; as the structure still stands over the arena, The Dome remains a name in common usage for the venue.  The arena, as well as the overall The O2 complex, is named after its primary sponsor, the telecommunications company O2, a subsidiary of Virgin Media O2.

History
Following the closure of the Millennium Experience at the end of 2000, the Millennium Dome was leased to Meridian Delta Ltd. in December 2001, for redevelopment as an entertainment complex. This included plans for an indoor arena.

Construction of the arena started in 2003, and finished in 2007. In December 2004, after the interior of the dome had been largely cleared and before building work inside began, the dome was used as the main venue for the annual Crisis Open Christmas organised by the London-based homelessness charity Crisis.

Owing to the impossibility of using cranes inside the dome structure, the arena's roof was constructed on the ground within the dome and then lifted; the arena building's structure was then built around the roof. The arena building, which houses the arena and the arena concourse, is independent from all other buildings in the O2 and houses all the arena's facilities. The arena building itself takes up 40% of the total dome structure.

The seating arrangement throughout the whole arena can be modified, similar to the Manchester Arena. The ground surface can also be changed between ice rink, basketball court, exhibition space, conference venue, private hire venue and concert venue.

The arena was designed to reduce echoing, a problem common among older arenas used for concerts.

On 18 February 2022 during Storm Eunice, large sections of the arena's fabric roof were shredded, causing the evacuation of 1,000 people, and the venue to close. It was later announced that repair works would take place and that the arena was likely to reopen on 25 February 2022, for a UB40 concert.

Events

In August 2007, rock star Prince began a series of 21 sold-out nights at the O2 Arena. The record-breaking run featured many of his hits while the set list changed every night so no two shows would be the same.

Beginning in July 2009, Michael Jackson was scheduled to hold a 50-show residency at the arena, titled This Is It. However, he died on 25 June, eighteen days before the first scheduled show.

The arena hosted the ATP World Tour Finals between 2009 and 2020.

During the 2012 Summer Olympics and Paralympics, the venue was referred as the North Greenwich Arena due to Olympics regulations regarding corporate sponsorship of event sites.

Since March 2013, the arena has hosted C2C: Country to Country, Europe's largest country music festival, which annually attracts over 20,000 fans. UK and Irish acts, as well as up-and-coming American acts, perform sets several times across various pop-up stages in and around the arena, with the main stage accessible only to ticket-holders. The seventh C2C was held on 8–10 March 2019.

Ariana Grande was scheduled to perform on 25 and 26 May 2017 as part of her Dangerous Woman Tour, but the event was cancelled after the Manchester Arena bombing on 22 May. The event was not rescheduled. Grande, however, held five concerts at the arena for her Sweetener World Tour on 17, 19, and 20 August 2019 as well as 15 and 16 October 2019.

On 30 November 2019, JoJo Siwa became the youngest person to perform in the O2 Arena at the age of 16, as part of her D.R.E.A.M. The Tour.

On 14 May 2022, Little Mix held their The Last Show (For Now) in the O2, which was their last show before their indefinite hiatus. Along with performing there live to 20,000 they also livestreamed the show live to millions for those who could not attend The Confetti Tour. 

On 15 October 2022, the O2 hosted a boxing match between Claressa Shields and Savannah Marshall that was the first time two female boxers headlined at a major venue in the United Kingdom. Shields won, and the fight headlined the first all-female boxing card in the United Kingdom.

On 1st July 2023, the O2 Arena will host WWE Money In The Bank.

Ticket sales records

Despite being open for only 200 days per year (the equivalent of seven months), the venue sold over 1.2 million tickets in 2007, making it the third most popular venue in the world for concerts and family shows, narrowly behind the Manchester Arena (1.25 million) and Madison Square Garden in New York City (1.23 million).

As of 2021, the O2 Arena was still the busiest music arena in the world in terms of ticket sales.

Prizes and awards
2016 Pollstar International Venue of the Year
2016 Billboard Touring Awards: Top Arena
2016 The London Venue Awards: Best Music Venue
2016 The Drum UK Event Awards: Large Venue of the Year
2017 Pollstar International Venue of the Year

See also
The O2
Millennium Dome
Live at the O² Arena
List of tennis stadiums by capacity

References

External links

 
 London 2012 Olympics profile

Arena
Venues of the 2012 Summer Olympics
Olympic basketball venues
Olympic gymnastics venues
2012 Summer Paralympic venues
Boxing venues in the United Kingdom
Basketball venues in England
Indoor ice hockey venues in England
Indoor arenas in London
Sports venues in London
Tennis venues in London
2007 establishments in England
Sports venues completed in 2007
Music venues completed in 2007
Music venues in London
Sport in the Royal Borough of Greenwich
Tourist attractions in the Royal Borough of Greenwich
Netball venues in England